This is the list of all the Ministers of Foreign Affairs, International Trade and Worship of the Argentine Republic since 1822. The Minister presides over the Ministry of Foreign Affairs and Worship, the country's supreme authority on international relations and part of the Cabinet of Argentina. In a similar fashion to other South America nations, the Minister of Foreign Affairs is generally styled as Chancellor (Canciller). The current Minister is Santiago Cafiero, who serves in President Alberto Fernández's cabinet.

List

See also
Ministry of Foreign Affairs, International Trade and Worship

References

External links
Official website of the Ministry of Foreign Affairs, International Trade and Worship (in Spanish)
Casa Rosada (in Spanish) – List of all Argentine presidents and their cabinets since 1826

Foreign Ministers
 
Argentina

Argentina diplomacy-related lists